Kya Aap Paanchvi Fail Champu Hain? is a game show on Indian Television and a parody on STAR Plus Show, Kya Aap Paanchvi Pass Se Tez Hain?.

Cheats 
Nok-Jhok ... A Parody On Taak Jaak
Copycat ... A Parody On Copy
Bajaao ... A Parody On Bachao

Teammate 
5 Kids Chosen By Show (Each kid will be picked once by a contestant only For two Questions, but not available on bonus)

5 Kids Named 
Freeya ... A Parody On Shriya Sharma
Harish Mehta ... A Parody On Dheirya Sonecha
Munna ... A Parody On Anubhav Motilal
Sridevi ... A Parody On Shreeparna Ghoshal
Makkhan Singh ... A Parody On Milanjeet Singh Bhatti

Deadline 
No deadline Question(This Method Not Included in This Parody)

Subject card 
A card given by show to categorize question in number of 10.

People on the Show 
This is a list of Parody Maden On celebrities like:

External links 
Official Site

Indian comedy television series
Filmy original programming
2008 Indian television series debuts
Parody television series
Cultural depictions of Amitabh Bachchan
Indian television sketch shows